Kurt Mercer Eversley (born 28 April 1970) is a Guyanese-born former cricketer who played for the Turks and Caicos Islands. Eversley was a right-handed batsman who bowled right-arm off break.

Eversely played a single Twenty20 match for the Turks and Caicos Islands against Montserrat in the 2008 Stanford 20/20 at the Stanford Cricket Ground. He ended the Turks and Caicos Islands innings of 67 unbeaten without scoring. Montserrat went on to win the match by 9 wickets, with Eversley not required to bowl.

References

External links
Kurt Eversley at ESPNcricinfo
Kurt Eversley at CricketArchive

1970 births
Living people
Turks and Caicos Islands cricketers
Guyanese emigrants to the Turks and Caicos Islands